Lilith, in comics, may refer to:

 Lilith (Marvel Comics), two comic book characters in the Marvel comics
 Lilith (DC Comics), a comic book superheroine in the DC Comics universe

See also
 Lilith (disambiguation)